Modiolus philippinarum, common name Philippine horse mussel, is a species of "horse mussel", a marine bivalve mollusc in the family Mytilidae, the mussels.

Description
These shells are thin but solid, swollen, elongate-ovate and roughly trapeziform. The anterior margin is short, while posterodorsal margin is long and oblique in relation to the ventral margin. Hind margin is convex and hinge-line is approximately one half the total length. Outer surface of the shell shows many concentric growth striae. The basic color of the external surface is yellowish brown, while the interior varies from pearly white to purplish red.

<div align=center>
Right and left valve of the same specimen:

</div align=center>

Distribution and habitat
This species is present in the Red Sea, Madagascar and Indo-Pacific, from eastern Africa, to eastern Indonesia; north to Japan and south to Queensland and Western Australia. It inhabits sublittoral muds, at depth of 0-40m.

References

philippinarum
Bivalves described in 1843
Taxa named by Sylvanus Charles Thorp Hanley